Sansol is a town and municipality located in the province and  autonomous community of Navarre, northern Spain. It is located opposite Torres Del Río, on a hill on the other side of the Linares River.

References

External links

 SANSOL in the Bernardo Estornés Lasa - Auñamendi Encyclopedia (Euskomedia Fundazioa) 

Municipalities in Navarre